Coverdale Cobblestone House is a historic home located at Leicester in Livingston County, New York. It was completed in 1837 and has a 2-story, three-by-four-bay cobblestone main block, a -story kitchen wing, and a 1-story cobblestone and frame carriage shed.  It was built in the late Federal / early Greek Revival style.  It features medium-sized cobbles in its construction.

The house underwent restoration between December 2005 and February 2010.  The mortar has been refinished, new thermal insulated windows, rebuilt carriage house, inside re-plastered, refinished plank wooden floors, and new front porch.  A new Crown Steam Boiler was installed in November 2009.  A new concrete basement floor was poured 4–6 inches thick; twin Roth 275 fuel oil tanks installed November 2010; a widow's walk was installed in summer of 2010.

It was listed on the National Register of Historic Places in 2005.

References

External links
Photo album of house from current restoration

Houses on the National Register of Historic Places in New York (state)
Cobblestone architecture
Federal architecture in New York (state)
Houses in Livingston County, New York
National Register of Historic Places in Livingston County, New York